Chang Feng (6 April 1923 – 6 February 2022) was a Chinese actor based in Taiwan. He died on 6 February 2022, at the age of 98.

Filmography

Film

TV dramas

References

External links
 
 

1923 births
2022 deaths
20th-century Chinese male actors
20th-century Taiwanese male actors
21st-century Chinese male actors
21st-century Taiwanese male actors
Male actors from Harbin
Taiwanese male film actors
Taiwanese male television actors
Taiwanese people from Heilongjiang
Chinese male film actors
Chinese male television actors
Chinese emigrants to Taiwan
Manchu male actors
Taiwanese people of Manchu descent